WLEZ may refer to:

 WLEZ (FM), a radio station (99.3 FM) licensed to serve Lebanon Junction, Kentucky, United States
 WLEZ-LP, a defunct radio station (98.1 FM) formerly licensed to serve Jackson, Mississippi, United States
 WBOW, a radio station (102.7 FM) licensed to serve Terre Haute, Indiana, United States, which held the call sign WLEZ from 1992 to 2003
 WCBF (FM), a radio station (96.1 FM) licensed to serve Elmira, New York, United States, which held the call sign WLEZ from 1977 to 1992